Pierre is a masculine given name. It is a French form of the name Peter. Pierre originally meant "rock" or "stone" in French (derived from the Greek word πέτρος (petros) meaning "stone, rock", via Latin "petra"). It is a translation of Aramaic כיפא (Kefa), the nickname Jesus gave to apostle Simon Bar-Jona, referred in English as Saint Peter. Pierre is also found as a surname.

People with the given name
 Abbé Pierre, Henri Marie Joseph Grouès (1912–2007), French Catholic priest who founded the Emmaus Movement
 Monsieur Pierre, Pierre Jean Philippe Zurcher-Margolle (c. 1890–1963), French ballroom dancer and dance teacher
 Pierre (footballer), Lucas Pierre Santos Oliveira (born 1982), Brazilian footballer
 Pierre, Baron of Beauvau (c. 1380–1453)
 Pierre, Duke of Penthièvre (1845–1919)
 Pierre, marquis de Fayet (died 1737), French naval commander and Governor General of Saint-Domingue
 Prince Pierre, Duke of Valentinois (1895–1964), father of Rainier III of Monaco
 Pierre Affre (1590–1669), French sculptor
 Pierre-Emerick Aubameyang, professional footballer who plays for the English club Chelsea and the Gabon national football team
 Pierre Barbe (1900–2004), French architect
 Pierre Bézier, engineer and mathematician known for his work with Bézier curves
 Pierre Boulez, French classical and electronic composer
 Pierre Boulle, French author
 Pierre Bourgault, public speaker, journalist and politician famed for his work for Quebec independence from Canada
 Pi'erre Bourne, American record producer, rapper, songwriter, and audio engineer.
 Pierre Bouvier, Canadian musician and lead singer of Simple Plan
 Pierre Brice, French actor 
 Pierre Caille (disambiguation), several people
 Pierre Capretz, host of French in Action
 Pierre Cardin, French fashion designer
 Pierre Cathala (1888–1947), French Minister of Finance from 1942 to 1944
 Pierre Chambrin, White House Executive Chef
 Pierre Chouteau, Jr., (1789–1865), American fur trader who established the trading post of Fort Pierre (South Dakota) in 1832
 Pierre Clostermann, French pilot who fought in World War II for the Royal Air Force (RAF)
 Pierre Conner, American mathematician
 Pierre Corneille, (1606 - 1684) French playwright known for Le Cid
 Pierre Corréia, French rugby union player
 Pierre de Coubertin, founder of the modern Olympic Games
 Pierre Courthion (1902–1988), Swiss art critic and historian
 Pierre Curie, French physicist and husband of Marie Curie
 Pierre Dagher, Lebanese actor and voice actor
 Pierre Darmon (born in 1934), French tennis player
 Pierre Daru (1767–1829), French soldier, statesman, historian, and poet
 Pierre de Fermat, French lawyer and mathematician
 Pierre Deladonchamps, French actor 
 Pierre Deland, Swedish actor and director
 Pierre Pelerin de Maricourt, French scholar
 Pierre Deligne, Belgian mathematician
 Pierre Dolbeault, French mathematician
 Pierre Engvall, Swedish ice hockey forward
 Pierre Fourier, Catholic saint and French priest
 Pierre Franckh, German actor
 Pierre Gagnaire, French chef
 Pierre Garçon, American football player
 Pierre Gasly, racing driver currently driving for Scuderia AlphaTauri in Formula One
 Pierre Gaspard (1834–1915), French mountain climber and guide
 Pierre Gaspard, Belgian physicist and professor
 Pierre Gemayel, politician and founder of the Al-Kataeb party in Lebanon
 Pierre David Guetta, French DJ, record producer and songwriter
 Pierre Harmel (1911–2009), former Belgian Prime Minister
 Pierre Henry, French musician
 Pierre Hermans, Dutch field hockey goalkeeper
 Pierre-Emile Kordt Højbjerg, Danish professional footballer
 Pierre van Hooijdonk, Dutch footballer
 Pierre Jallow, Gambian basketball player
 Pierre Jeanpierre, French soldier
 Pierre Yves Kéralum (1817–1872), French-American priest and architect
 Pierre Laporte (1921–1970), Canadian journalist, lawyer, and politician
 Pierre Lavertu, Canadian football player
 Pierre Le Faguays (1892–1962), French sculptor
 Pierre Levasseur (disambiguation), several people
 Pierre Littbarski, German footballer
 Pierre van Maldere, South Dutch composer
 Pierre Marchand (editor), French publisher
 Pierre Menard, American fur trader and politician
 Pierre Morel, French film director
 Pierre Nkurunziza, former president of Burundi
 Pierre Papillaud (1935–2017), French billionaire businessman
 Pierre Pilote, ice hockey player
 Pierre Pincemaille, French musician
 Pierre Poilievre, Canadian federal MP for the riding of Nepean-Carleton
 Pierre-Joseph Proudhon, the first self-proclaimed anarchist and is regarded by some as the founder of modern anarchist theory
 Pierre-Loup Rajot, French actor and director 
 Pierre-Auguste Renoir, French impressionist artist 
 Pierre Roger (swimmer), French swimmer
 Pierre Salinger, Press Secretary to US President John F. Kennedy
 Pierre Sanoussi-Bliss, German actor and director 
 Pierre Schaeffer, French experimental musician
 Pierre Schapira (mathematician), French mathematician
 Pierre Shammassian, Lebanese-Armenian comedian
 Pierre Sinaÿ, French organic chemist
 Pierre Sokolsky, American physicist
 Pierre Sprey, French-American aircraft designer
 Pierre Strong Jr. (born 1998), American football player
 Pierre Taki, Japanese musician
 Pierre Tendean revolution hero from Indonesia
 Pierre Thomas (disambiguation), several people
 Pierre Trudeau, former Canadian Prime Minister
 Pierre Turgeon, Québécois NHL Hall of Famer
 Pierre Vatin (born 1967), French politician
 Pierre Vogel (born 1978), German Islamist Preacher
 Pierre Warren, American football player

People with the surname
 Aaron Pierre (born 1993), footballer
 Carmine Pierre-Dufour, Canadian film director and screenwriter
 DBC Pierre (penname), Mexican writer
 Georges St-Pierre (born 1981), Canadian MMA fighter and former UFC Welterweight champion
 James Pierre (born 1996), American football player
 Jean Baptiste Louis Pierre (1833–1905), French botanist
 John Wallace Pierre, American engineer
 Juan Pierre (born 1977), American baseball player
 Percy A. Pierre (born 1939), American electrical engineer and mathematician
 Perri Pierre (born 1988), Haitian-American actor and film producer
 Raymond Pierre (born 1967), American track and field athlete
 Robert Pierre (born 1992), Christian recording artist
 Roger Pierre (1923–2010), French actor

Aliases
 Pierre Carl Ouellet, former ring name of Canadian wrestler Carl Ouellet (born 1967)
 Pierre Poutine, an alias used in an attempt to hide certain parties involved in the 2011 Canadian federal election voter suppression scandal

Fictional characters
 Pierre, a Chrono Cross playable character
 Pierre, a character in JumpStart
 Pierre, in the 2016 film A Wedding
 Pierre Bezukhov, a central character in the novel War and Peace by Leo Tolstoy
 Pierre Escargot, a French teacher from the TV show All That, played by Kenan Thompson
 Pierre Belmondo, a Wipeout character responsible for the birth of anti-gravity racing
Dominique Pierre, in the Netflix series Grand Army

See also
 Pierre (disambiguation)
 Lucky Pierre (disambiguation)
 Saint-Pierre (disambiguation)
 Jean-Pierre (given name)
 Pierre-Simon

References

Given names
French masculine given names
Surnames of Haitian origin